Captain Ernesto Esguerra Cubides Air Base , also known as Tres Esquinas Air Base, is a Colombian military base assigned to the Colombian Air Force (Fuerza Aérea Colombiana or FAC) Combat Air Command No. 6 (Comando Aéreo de Combate No. 6 or CACOM 6). The base is located at Tres Esquinas in the Caquetá Department of Colombia. It is named in honor of Captain Ernesto Esguerra Cubides.

Facilities 

See also
Transport in Colombia
List of airports in Colombia

References

External links
 

Colombian Air Force bases
Buildings and structures in Caquetá Department